Nea Zichni is a municipality in the Serres regional unit, of Central Macedonia region, Greece. Population 12,397 (2011). Nea Zichni is also the name of the administrative seat of the municipality, population 2,530 (2011).

History

The city was originally built next to the marches of Lake Achinos, on the hill of "Toumba" (2 km south of Nea Zichni) and it was called Ichna. It was a Paionian city, that was sometime in the 5th or early 4th century BC incorporated into the Macedonian Kingdom. Another city by the same name Ichna is mentioned by Thucydides being next to Pella, by the estuary of the Loudias and Axios rivers. The name Ichna is a Paionian cognate of the Greek word "ichnos" which means "stepping ground" a name appropriate for a city built on the sand between the marsh and the lake (or the sea). The original Ichna remained a city throughout the Hellenistic, Roman and Byzantine eras, only to be destroyed and was rebuilt far from the lake in its original position on the hills. During the Ottoman years it was a kaza centre in the Sanjak of Serres in the Salonica Eyalet.

Municipality
The municipality Nea Zichni was formed at the 2011 local government reform by the merger of the following 2 former municipalities, that became municipal units:
Alistrati
Nea Zichni

The municipality has an area of 404.307 km2, the municipal unit 274.429 km2.

Gallery

External links
http://www.dimos-neaszixnis.gr

References

Municipalities of Central Macedonia
Populated places in Serres (regional unit)